Guano is the accumulated excrement of seabirds or bats, often mined as a source of phosphorus.

Guano may also refer to

Plants
 Guano or Guano palm, any one of several species of palm trees in the genera Coccothrinax, Copernicia and Sabal, or the leaves of such palms used as thatch

Comics
 Guano (Kappa Mikey), a fictional Pikachu-like character in the animated series Kappa Mikey

Film, TV and stage
 Colonel 'Bat' Guano, a fictional character in the film  Dr. Strangelove or: How I Learned to Stop Worrying and Love the Bomb (1964)

Places
 Guano Canton, a subdivision of Chimborazo Province, Ecuador
 Guano, Ecuador, a town which is the administrative center of Guano Canton, in Chimborazo Province, Ecuador

See also
Guana (disambiguation)
Iguana
Goanna